Justine Henin-Hardenne defeated the defending champion Amélie Mauresmo in the final, 6–4, 6–3 to win the singles tennis title at the 2006 WTA Tour Championships. It was her first Tour Finals title. Henin-Hardenne also secured the year-end world No. 1 ranking by reaching the final.

Seeds
* As of October 30, 2006.

Alternates

Draw

Finals

Red group

Standings are determined by: 1. number of wins; 2. number of matches; 3. in two-players-ties, head-to-head records; 4. in three-players-ties, percentage of sets won, or of games won; 5. steering-committee decision.

Yellow group

Standings are determined by: 1. number of wins; 2. number of matches; 3. in two-players-ties, head-to-head records; 4. in three-players-ties, percentage of sets won, or of games won; 5. steering-committee decision.

See also
WTA Tour Championships appearances

References

Singles